The Albula Railway is a single track metre gauge railway line forming part of the so-called core network of the Rhaetian Railway (RhB), in the canton of Graubünden, Switzerland.

Construction of the Albula Railway was begun in September 1898, the opening took place on 1 July 1903, and the extension to St. Moritz commenced operations on 10 July 1904. With its 55 bridges and 39 tunnels, the  line is one of the most spectacular narrow gauge railways in the world.

On 7 July 2008, the Albula Railway and the Bernina Railway, which also forms part of the RhB, were jointly recorded in the list of UNESCO World Heritage Sites, under the name Rhaetian Railway in the Albula / Bernina Landscapes.

The best known trains operating on the Albula Railway are the Glacier Express and the Bernina Express.

History 

Up until 1890, the south east of Switzerland was extremely poorly served by railways. Alpine transit traffic was drawn to the Gotthard Railway, so that the construction of transcontinental railways in Graubünden appeared not to be economically viable. Only the success of the Landquart-Davos-Bahn (LD) led to a turning point. In 1895, the LD changed its name to Rhaetian Railway (RhB). Two years later, the people of Graubünden decided, in a referendum, that the RhB would come under state ownership. These two changes created suitable conditions for a rapid construction of further RhB lines, which were intended to open up large parts of the Canton.

In 1890, the Davos hotelier  proposed the construction of a rail link from Chur via Davos, and through a tunnel under the Scaletta Pass, to St Moritz, and then onwards via the Maloja Pass, to Chiavenna in Italy. Holsboer later had to abandon this planned Scalettabahn, in favour of a route through what was to become the Albula Tunnel. In 1895, the Zurich railway pioneer Adolf Guyer-Zeller presented the idea of an Engadine-Orient-Railway, which would have connected Chur, via Thusis and Engadine, and over the Fuorn Pass, with the Vinschgau and Trieste. Zeller planned this proposed route as a standard gauge line. It would have passed under the Albula Alps through a 12 km long tunnel from the mouth of the Val Tisch to the Inn Valley below Bever. As the Ofenbergbahn, the Engadine-Orient-Railway would also have cut a connection through to the Val Müstair. It was only on 30 June 1898 that the Federal Assembly in Bern finally decided on the construction of the Albula Railway. The Federal Assembly thereby also decided against another standard gauge transit railway, and a similarly contemplated railway over the Julier Pass.

In 1896, there were only 20 km of standard gauge railway line in Graubünden - and 90 km of narrow gauge railways. (Incidentally, the length of the standard gauge line has remained unchanged to this day, apart from the construction of a new industrial spur line from Chur to Domat / Ems.) Priority was given to the construction of a rail connection to the spa at St Moritz, which at that time was a 14-hour stage coach ride distant from Chur, the terminus of the standard gauge line.

After Thusis was reached from Chur, the construction of the Albula Railway began on 15 October 1898. Unlike the Bernina Railway, which was opened a good ten years later, and operated in fully electrified form right from the start, the Albula Railway was still a steam railway at its conception. Moreover, (and again unlike the Bernina Railway), it was intended to be universally available, particularly for the transport of goods. As the steam locomotives of the time were still not particularly powerful, and in order to permit the highest possible speeds, the maximum gradients were restricted to 3.5%, and the minimum curve radius was also generously defined. Thus, the Albula Railway, in the interests of maximising its effectiveness, did not test the technical bounds of an adhesion railway. However, such an architectural style required a variety of engineering structures. So, for example, the viaducts were exclusively solidly constructed. Especially problematical was the ascent of the valley between Bergün/Bravuogn and Preda, where, in a distance of 5 km as the crow flies, a difference in altitude of over 400 m needed to be overcome. To stay within the maximum gradient parameters, the project supervisor, Friedrich Hennings, devised an intricate alignment, which lengthened the line's formation by 12 km. Two curved tunnels, three spiral tunnels, and a number of bridges overcame the engineering problem, by winding the track around like the thread of a screw. On this part of the line, the construction of the 660 m long Rugnux Spiral Tunnels in particular led to problems, because the 4 °C cold mountain water hampered the activities of the workers.

Beyond Preda emerged the centrepiece of the line, the 5866 m long Albula Tunnel, which passes under the watershed between the Rhine and the Danube a few kilometres west of the Albula Pass. The creation of the tunnel was hampered by unusual problems caused by outflowing water, and these led to the bankruptcy of the building contractor. A total of 1,316 people were involved in the construction of the Albula Tunnel. Overall, there were 16 fatal accidents involving workers.

On 1 July 1903, the opening of the section between Thusis and Celerina could be celebrated. As the RhB and the St Moritz municipality were still yet to reach agreement over the site of the St. Moritz station, the inauguration of the 3 km long remaining section had to be delayed to 10 July 1904.

Shortages of coal during World War I prompted the RhB to grapple with the task of electrification. On 20 April 1919, the first section of the line to be electrified, the link between Bever and Filisur, was energised with the 11 kV 16 2/3 Hz alternating current system used on the Engadine line. On 15 October 1919, the extension to Thusis followed.

Since 1930, the Glacier Express has followed the route of the Albula Railway. The Bernina Express was added after World War II. Both of these trains have since operated as spearheads of the Rhaetian Railway's legendary reputation as a railway company amongst rail fans from around the world.

Since the line was equipped with a block safety system in 1969, remote monitoring of train traffic at most stations on the line has been possible. In 2005, the Rail Control Center in Landquart assumed the former tasks of the remote monitoring station at Filisur.

The Bever substation was modernised in 1973. Since the end of the 1990s, the RhB has installed three short double track sections - at Thusis, at Filisur and below Preda - to make the hourly train crossings flow more smoothly. The remaining parts of the line are single track as before, and are still largely in their original configuration from 1904.

In 2022, the operator set a new world record for longest passenger train, when 100 coaches formed a 1.9 km long train, travelling a 25 km distance.

Accidents and incidents

On 13 August 2014, a passenger train was struck by a landslide and derailed at Tiefencastel, Graubünden. Eleven people were injured.

Description of the railway 
The Albula Railway begins in Thusis, where it connects with the Landquart-Chur railway, built in 1896. Behind Thusis station, the line crosses the Hinterrhein, as well as the A 13 Autobahn, and enters the Albula Valley, which, east of Thusis, is known as the Schinschlucht. Even at this early stage, it passes many bridges and tunnels.

At Filisur station is the junction between the Albula Railway and the branch line from Davos Platz. Between Filisur and Bergün, the train ascends , and runs through the first spiral tunnel. Soon after departure from Bergün station, where an RhB Crocodile stands as a locomotive monument, the train climbs once again at a rate of 3.5%. By means of the various structures just identified, the line crosses over itself twice. Rail fans can also view the Bergün-Preda section from a rail history nature trail adjacent to the line.

After passing through the tunnel, and the Spinas station at the southern portal, the train descends at a slope of up to 3.2%, to arrive in the Oberengadine at Bever, in the Val Bever. Here there is a junction with the Engadine Railway from Scuol-Tarasp. At the next station, Samedan, the line to Pontresina branches off. The Bernina Express takes this branch, which connects the Albula Railway with the Bernina Railway to Tirano. On the other hand, the Glacier Express follows the main line, via Celerina, to the terminus of the Albula Railway at St. Moritz.

Originally, it was planned to extend the Albula Railway via the Maloja Pass, to Chiavenna in Italy. At the terminus of the extension, there was to have been a connection with the Italian railway line that runs along Lake Como to Milan. In light of those plans, the St Moritz station was, and still is, laid out as a through station. Whereas on the Swiss side plans for a line through the Bergell reached an advanced stage, there were, on the Italian side, only vague statements of intent, for a line proceeding onwards from the border at Castasegna. World War I, and the subsequent economic recession, prevented any implementation of the plans. Today, the Maloja Pass route is served by a cross border post bus line.

Train traffic 

Between Chur and St Moritz, there are fast trains every day at regular hourly intervals. These trains have been officially known as RegioExpress services since December 2004. Only the so-called fast train stations are served by these trains. At the other stations, trains have no longer stopped since the 1990s. In Surava and Alvaneu, only some trains still stop, and only then in off peak times. In the high summer season, there are also special tourist oriented express trains with panorama cars, for which reservations and supplements are required. These trains are the Glacier Express from Zermatt to St Moritz, and the Bernina Express from Chur via Samedan and Pontresina to Tirano.

The most frequently used motive power on the Albula Railway is the modern Ge 4/4 III class of electric locomotive, which is also in service on the Vereina line. The Albula Railway was once the main stamping ground of the Rhaetian Crocodile (the Ge 6/6 I). The two remaining locos of this class, and the similarly historic Ge 4/6, still operate today at the head of not uncommon special trains. In contrast, the newer RhB locomotives have not achieved the popularity of the Crocodiles. However, they are in everyday use, and the operational difficulties they face can hardly be compared with those to be found on other railways of this magnitude and gauge, due to the nature of the route, and the density of the traffic. Additionally there is, for a narrow gauge railway, unusually dense goods traffic, which in mountainous terrain takes over much of what would otherwise be carried by road traffic. Almost all of the stations on the line are served with goods trains; the larger stations are equipped with (at least) one shunting locomotive of their own. The most important goods transiting the line are timber, cement and other building materials, mineral oil products and foodstuffs.

A further area of responsibility of the railway is the transport of cars through the mountainous terrain, together with their passengers. The alpine weather conditions make it impossible to use the alpine passes all year round, whereas with the help of the Albula Railway, the mountain barrier can be overcome without any problems. The Rhaetian Railway therefore offers road users the option of loading their own cars in Thusis onto special car carriers, for transport to Samedan.

On the Bergün-Preda section, there are also so-called sledding trains operating in winter. These are shuttle services, which carry sledders and tobogganers from Bergün to Preda. At Preda, the sledders and tobogganers connect with the Albula Pass road, which is closed for traffic in winter, and used as a toboggan track to Bergün.

See also 

 Albula Railway Museum
 List of mountain railways in Switzerland

Notes and references 
 This article is based upon a translation of the German language version as at November 2009.

Bibliography 

 Gian Brüngger, Tibert Keller, Renato Mengotti: Abenteuer Albulabahn. Chur 2003, .
 Gion Caprez und Peter Pfeiffer: Albulabahn. Harmonie von Landschaft und Technik. Zürich 2003, .
 Hubertus von Salis Soglio: Bahnhistorischer Lehrpfad Preda-Bergün. Herausgegeben vom Verkehrsverein Bergün. Thusis 51997 (sold at RhB outlets or at the Bergün station).
 Henning Wall: Albula–Schlagader Graubündens. Aachen 1984, .
 Eisenbahn Journal Sonderausgabe Rhätische Bahn (I). Hermann Merker Verlag, Fürstenfeldbruck 1.1988, pp 34–102 .
 Friedrich Hennings: Projekt und Bau der Albulabahn. Chur 1908.
 Hennings: Die neuen Linien der Rhätischen Bahn. In: Schweizerische Bauzeitung. Vol. 37/38, 1901, pp 5–7 (PDF; 2,3 MB).

Transport in the Alps
Metre gauge railways in Switzerland
Mountain railways
Railway lines in Switzerland
Railway lines opened in 1903
Rhaetian Railway lines
Tourist attractions in Switzerland
World Heritage Sites in Switzerland
Thusis
Bergün Filisur
St. Moritz